The 1969–70 Northern Premier League was the second season of the Northern Premier League, a regional football league in Northern England, the northern areas of the Midlands and North Wales. The season began on 9 August 1969 and concluded on 9 May 1970.

Overview
The League featured twenty teams for the second consecutive season.

Team changes
The following three clubs left the League at the end of the previous season:
Ashington resigned, demoted to Northern Alliance
Chorley relegated to Lancashire Combination
Worksop Town relegated to Midland League (1889)

The following three clubs joined the League at the start of the season:
Stafford Rangers promoted from Cheshire County League
Great Harwood promoted from Lancashire Combination
Matlock Town promoted from Midland League (1889)

League table

Results

Stadia and locations

Cup results

Challenge Cup

FA Cup

Out of the twenty clubs from the Northern Premier League only South Shields reached for the second round:

Second Round

Third Round

FA Trophy

Out of the twenty clubs from the Northern Premier League only Macclesfield Town reached for the fourth round:

Fourth Round

Semi-finals

Final

End of the season
At the end of the second season of the Northern Premier League none of the teams put forward, for election, received enough votes to be promoted to the Football League.  Hyde United resigned the league, due to financial difficulties and Gateshead was relegated.

Football League elections
Alongside the four Football League teams facing re-election, a total of thirteen non-League teams applied for election, three of which were from the Northern Premier League.  Three out of the four Football League teams were re-elected.  Cambridge United from the Southern League replaced Bradford Park Avenue from the Football League as they didn't receive enough votes.  Bradford Park Avenue was subsequently relegated to the Northern Premier League.

Promotion and relegation
The League expanded from twenty clubs to twenty-two clubs for the following season.

The following two clubs left the League at the end of the season:
Hyde United resigned, demoted to Cheshire County League
Gateshead relegated to Wearside Football League

The following four clubs joined the League the following season:
Bradford Park Avenue relegated from Football League Fourth Division.
Chorley promoted from Lancashire Combination (returning after a year's absence)
Kirkby Town promoted from Lancashire Combination
Lancaster City promoted from Lancashire Combination

References

External links
 Northern Premier League official website
 Northern Premier League tables at RSSSF
 Football Club History Database

Northern Premier League seasons
5—